Keep Smiling is the second studio album released by the Danish pop group Laid Back.

Track listing
"Elevator Boy" - 4:55
"Slowmotion Girl" - 5:51
"White Horse" - 4:42
"So Wie So" - 4:31
"High Society Girl" - 3:36
"Don't Be Mean" - 3:21
"Sunshine Reggae" - 4:16
"Fly Away (Walking in the Sunshine)" - 8:28

Vinyl LP track listing
Side One
"White Horse" — 4:42
"Elevator Boy" — 4:55
"Slowmotion Girl" — 5:51
"So Wie So" — 4:32
Side Two
"Sunshine Reggae" — 4:15
"High Society Girl" — 3:41
"Don't Be Mean" — 3:22
"Fly Away/Walking in the Sunshine" — 8:35

Credits
Produced by Laid Back and the 7 Dwarfs. Words & Music by Tim Stahl & John Guldberg. Sing A Song Publishing. 
All voices, sounds and instruments by Tim Stahl and John Guldberg, except Frank Marstokk: drums on "Elevator Boy", "So Wie So", "High Society Girl", "Sunshine Reggae". Jeppe Repurth: drums on " High Society Girl". Jorgen Thomsen: backing vocals on "Slowmotion Girl", Don't Be Mean". Peter Hansen: bass on "Sunshine Reggae". Romano Moszkowicz: good vibes. Additional instruments supplied by Drumstick, Fangel Music, Musikplaneten, Super Sound.
All songs recorded & mixed at Laid Back Studio, Copenhagen, Denmark; Engineer: Gis Ingvardtsen, except "Elevator Boy" remixed at Puk Studio, Randers, Denmark; Engineer: John "Puk" Quist.
Cover by Varab-Stegelmann Studio, Photos: Fancois Granjan & Dick Neil, Artwork: Ingo Milton, Palm by Clive Homes. 
Management: Wennick Bros.
Thanks to the crew at Easy Sound & Werner Studio; and the Medley Team.

References

1983 albums
Laid Back albums
Sire Records albums
Funk albums by Danish artists